The Last Witness is a 2001 South Korean thriller film directed by Bae Chang-ho and starring Lee Jung-jae, Ahn Sung-ki and Lee Mi-yeon. It is based on the novel of the same name by Kim Seong-jong, and is the second adaptation of the book, the first being in 1980.

Plot
A political prisoner, Hwang-seok is released after 50 years of solitary confinement. A day later, a body with stab wounds is recovered from a harbor. Detective Oh investigates the death and determines the body is that of Yang, a former soldier. Discovering a diary amongst Yang's possessions, Oh follows a trail of clues to a blind antique dealer, Ji-hye. It transpires that it was Yang who was responsible for the imprisonment of Hwang-seok, a suspected communist sympathizer in the Korean War. This makes Hwang-seok the prime suspect for the murder of Yang. But not all is as it seems, and a series of flashbacks back to the dark days of the Korean War and the infamous Geoje POW Camp on Geoje Island leads Oh to Han, a former North Korean soldier living in Japan, and a final, tragic resolution for two ill-fated lovers.

Cast
 Lee Jung-jae as Detective Oh
 Ahn Sung-ki as Hwang-seok
 Lee Mi-yeon as Ji-hye
 Jung Joon-ho as Han Dong-ju
 Lee Ki-young as Yang

See also 
Cinema of Korea

Notes

References

External links
 
 

2001 films
2000s Korean-language films
Korean War films
South Korean thriller films
Films based on Korean novels
2000s South Korean films
2001 thriller films